Triplophysa lacustris is a species of stone loach endemic to China. It is only found in Lake Xinyun in Yunnan. It grows to  standard length.

References

lacustris
Freshwater fish of China
Endemic fauna of Yunnan
Fish described in 1990